Ophiostoma wageneri is a plant pathogen. Leptographium wageneri var. pseudotsugae develops on Douglas-fir.

See also
 List of Douglas-fir diseases

References

External links

Fungal conifer pathogens and diseases
Ophiostomatales
Fungi described in 1962